The 53rd Anti-aircraft Missiles Regiment "Trophaeum Traiani" (Regimentul 53 Rachete Antiaeriene) is an air defense regiment of the Romanian Land Forces. It is currently subordinated to the 2nd Infantry Division and its headquarters are located in Medgidia (near Constanța). The regiment was part of the 6th Anti-aircraft Missiles Brigade, which was disbanded in 2006, due to a reorganization process of the Romanian Land Forces. The unit currently operates the S-75 "Volhov" surface-to-air missile systems.

References

External links

   Official Site of the Romanian Land Forces
  Official Site of the 1st Territorial Army Corps

Regiments of Romania
Military units and formations established in 1968
Air defence units and formations of the Romanian Army